Lieutenant Harry Neville Compton was a World War I flying ace credited with five aerial victories.

Compton originally served with the Canadian Military Engineers, transferring to the Royal Flying Corps on 14 February 1918. That summer, he was posted to No. 23 Squadron on the Western Front, to fly Sopwith Dolphins. He scored his first victory on 1 July 1918, when he destroyed an Albatros D.V near Hangest. He destroyed a Pfalz D.III and a Fokker D.VII fighter, and drove down another D.VII out of control before tallying his last victory. That was over a DFW reconnaissance two-seater on 1 November 1918, and was shared with fellow ace James William Pearson.

Sources of information

References
Above the Trenches: a Complete Record of the Fighter Aces and Units of the British Empire Air Forces 1915–1920. Christopher F. Shores, Norman L. R. Franks, Russell Guest. Grub Street, 1990. , .

1899 births
1951 deaths
Canadian World War I flying aces
People from Winnipeg
Royal Air Force personnel of World War I
Royal Canadian Engineers soldiers
Canadian military personnel from Manitoba
Recipients of the Distinguished Flying Cross (United Kingdom)